A timeline of significant geological events in the evolution of Western North America. Dates are approximate. ("Ma" = millions of years ago)

External links
 Geologic History of California: A Brief Overview by Joel Michaelsen
 Dating of the Ages of Three Plutonic Episodes in the Sierra

Geology timelines
North America geology-related lists
Timelines of North American history
Natural history of North America
Geology of California
Western United States